= Sexandroide =

- Directed by: Michel Ricaud
- Edited by: Norma Poulipoulos
- Music by: Jimmy Screamerclauz
- Release date: 1987
- Running time: 51 min.
- Country: France
- Language: French

Sexandroide is a 1987 French short horror film directed by Michel Ricaud. This film has music composed by Jimmy Screamerclauz.

== Plot ==
A monstrous madman stalks and slowly mutilates young girls through various disturbing and gruesome methods.

== Cast ==
Daniel Dubois plays a voodoo practitioner in the segment "La Dagyde", a torturous monster in the segment "Les Sexandroïdes" and a vampire in the segment "Avec la Compagnine".
